The survival of wild salmon relies heavily on them having suitable habitat for spawning and rearing of their young. This habitat is the main concern for conservationists. Salmon habitat can be degraded by many different factors including land development, timber harvest, or resource extraction.  These threats bring about the traditional methods of protecting the salmon, but a new movement aims to protect the habitats before they require intervention.

History of salmon decline 
Wild salmon in California, Oregon, Washington, Idaho, and southern British Columbia have been on a 160+ year downward trend and are now at very low levels. Efforts to reverse the decline have been extensive and expensive, but have not met with much success.

Salmon in the lower 48 states are well on their way to attaining the status enjoyed by some other notable species — wolves, condors, grizzlies, bison — wild animals that are unlikely to disappear entirely, but struggle to survive as remnants of once flourishing species in small portions of their original range. In California, Oregon, Idaho, Washington, and southern British Columbia, many runs are reduced to less than 10% of their historical numbers; some have disappeared. Many salmon runs are dominated by hatchery-bred fish. In the Columbia River, once one of the largest salmon-producers, over 80% of the total run is now hatchery-bred fish.

The pattern of salmon decline is not unique to western North America. Of the Earth's four regions where salmon runs occurred historically (Asian Far East, Atlantic Europe, eastern North America, and western North America), it appears probable that salmon runs in California, Oregon, Washington, Idaho, and southern British Columbia, without a dramatic change in current and long-term trends, will emulate the other three: extirpated or much reduced runs. Since the late 1840s, an array of factors has caused the decline and a plethora of specific impediments has prevented their recovery. Throughout the region, many wild salmon stocks (a group of interbreeding individuals that is roughly equivalent to a "population") have declined and some have disappeared.

The status of salmon along the west coast of North America is not uniform. Some wild salmon and habitat restoration possibilities are better than others. There are still relatively healthy runs of wild salmon (and habitat) in some locations such as the coastal watersheds of Northern California, Oregon, Washington, and some areas of southern British Columbia. Runs in northern British Columbia, Yukon, and Alaska are in much better condition.

Past policy choices

1820–1840 — With the arrival of trappers in the Pacific Northwest in the early 19th century, a systematic, intense harvest of beavers began. Large numbers of beaver can considerably alter the aquatic environment, in most cases improving salmon rearing habitat. As beaver populations declined, many salmon runs were adversely affected. As competition intensified between the United States and Great Britain for control of the Pacific Northwest, the British Hudson's Bay Company adopted a policy of leaving no beaver in the watersheds they trapped, because without beavers, the American fur trappers (and settlers) would be less likely to come to the Pacific Northwest. The overall effect on West Coast salmon of nearly extirpating beaver is unknown, but it was likely great.

1848 — The most visible milestone in the two-century decline of wild salmon occurred with the discovery of gold in California. By 1849, the decline of salmon started in earnest and was widely reported in the newspapers of the day. By the 1850s, excessive harvest and the impacts of mining activities had decimated salmon in streams in and surrounding the California Central Valley. In response, there were regulations restricting some fishing and mining practices. Later, there were calls for the creation of salmon hatcheries to provide supplemental stocking to overcome the devastating effects of mining operations.

1870–1900 — In the Central Valley of California, after a 30-year decline in salmon runs, supplemental stocking from hatcheries was widely viewed by professional fisheries scientists and the public as the solution to declining salmon runs. By 1900, stocking from hatcheries had largely won out over preserving or restoring natural habitat as the preferred recovery strategy.

1905–1939 — The political goal to "reclaim the Klamath Basin" (along the Oregon/California border) reflected the values and priorities of the era. Creating productive farmland by irrigation was the public policy goal. In the competition between societal priorities, irrigated agriculture won out over salmon. Over the next several decades, millions of dollars were spent to develop an elaborate system of dams and canals in the Klamath Basin (and elsewhere).

1929–39 — The policy goal to "put people to work" dominated the political landscape as people debated how to counter the effects of the Great Depression. Massive public works projects, such the high dams of the Columbia Basin and elsewhere, were built even though the anticipated and ruinous effect on wild salmon was understood. A single dam, the Grand Coulee, completely and permanently blocked a quarter of the Columbia Basin to migratory salmon, a thousand miles of the mainstem river lost to salmon in a single action.

1941–45 — The posters adorning many public buildings proclaimed "America — the Arsenal of Democracy". Warplanes were needed in great quantities and in the shortest possible time. Thus, electrical generation in the Pacific Northwest was greatly increased to supply the voracious appetites of aluminum smelters. The hydro-power was there; the war-time demand for aluminum was acute; the public support was near universal. Turbines, operating at maximum capacity seven days per week, 24 hours per day, for four years, chewed up salmon at devastating rates. It was a war for survival and bombers won out over salmon.

1948 — Widespread floods caused disastrous effects across the region, and politicians heeded the public's call for protection. After the 1948 flood, many flood control dams were built in Washington, Oregon, Idaho, and British Columbia. Society collectively demanded that human life and property be protected from uncontrolled river discharges.

1955–65 – The technology for cheap, effective home and commercial air conditioning developed rapidly after World War II. By 1960, the indirect effect on salmon of widespread adoption of air conditioning was clear: (1) greatly increased demand for electricity; and (2) increased overall regional population growth because previously undesirable areas became, with the advent of air conditioning, more desirable places to live. Much of the West Coast is hot during summer months, thus air conditioners found a receptive market.  Directly relevant to salmon runs, electricity demand is now high for both winter and summer, necessitating more generating capacity and transmission lines.

1991–2011 — The first salmon "distinct population segment" was listed under terms of the Endangered Species Act. With this action, the policy debate shifted away from restoring salmon runs in order to support fishing, to protecting salmon runs from extinction, two very different policy objectives. A century ago there was not much concern over whether a salmon started life in a hatchery or in a stream. Now, according to some, hatchery-produced salmon are not the restoration solution, they are part of the restoration problem.
	
2001 — The California drought of 2001 was severe, and combined with ongoing California blackouts, provoked the U.S. Bonneville Power Administration to declare a power emergency, abandon previously agreed upon interagency salmon flow release targets, and generate electricity for transmission to California using water reserved to help salmon migrate.

Traditional protections
Traditionally salmon habitats have not been protected until they are severely degraded and the run is nearing extinction.  At that time, several steps might be taken to restore the population.  Fish hatcheries are a popular remedy that are successful in the short term.  However, they may just be masking a problem instead of getting to the root of it.  Other methods of conservation may include limiting or eliminating harvests of the run, protecting water quality or reducing water extraction for human consumption, and protecting the habitat. In the last 20 years, Washington State Fisheries, in cooperation with local tribes, has decreased the Puget Sound salmon harvest by as much as 90%.

Protection of habitat is addressed in a core/satellite model in which certain areas are identified as highly used "core" areas and less valuable "satellite" areas.  This model assumes that not all potential habitats will be used by the salmon.  The problem with this method is that the reaches between the core and satellite areas are given a low intrinsic potential, which may result in a lower priority for protection.  If these corridors become impassable due to damming or destruction of riparian habitat, the corresponding satellite region is lost as habitat.  If several of these reaches go unprotected, the total habitat area for the salmon can quickly dwindle.  This is considered by some to be a losing strategy, possible leading to the extinction of salmon.

Protective sanctuary strategy
A new method of conservation has been put forward by Rahr and Augerot of the Wild Salmon Center.  Their method takes a broader stance at protecting salmon habitat.  Instead of using the core/satellite approach, they propose protecting entire river basins as whole systems.  They call this the "Proactive Sanctuary Strategy", which aims to preserve the stream habitats in the western United States and Canada with particularly high values, areas considered "salmon strongholds".  There is an estimated four to six stream basins that would meet this requirement.  These high-value basins are irreplaceable and must be protected now while they are still mostly pristine.  Basins or "strongholds" in this category are expected to be able to sustain themselves for the next 100 years.  This method is not meant to be a replacement to the currently ongoing protections afforded by local, state, and federal governments, such as the methods discussed above.  Instead, it is a proactive method to reduce or prevent the need for these other methods.
	
The idea for this "headwaters to the sea" strategy was first proposed in 1892.  Due to the success of hatcheries on American rivers, the idea did not gain any momentum at the time.  The idea was revived in the early 1990s when conservationists realized the shortcomings and lack of coordination between efforts by federal, state, and local authorities.  The agencies in charge of the fisheries such as NOAA often lack the authority to act on existing threats.  The new conceptualization of salmon habitat conservation posited that we must protect the most intact or valuable drainages first by working from the headwaters downstream to create a continuous corridor of protected habitat.  Several of these sub-basin scale refuges would come together to protect an entire basin as a whole unit.  This does not mean that all of the land will be owned by governments or conservation organizations.  The plan envisions both public and private landowners working together on a sub-basin scale to preserve habitat.  This goal will be met using three main principles.  The first aims to create "a series of intact and diverse (in terms of life histories, genetics, and species) Pacific salmon populations in full basin sanctuaries."  These populations could be a source of individuals to transplant to other rivers if needed.  The second principle aims to "Ensure the maintenance of functional habitat connectivity from the headwaters to the estuary."  This connection of habitat helps to promote diversity in the population by providing several localized spawning locations.  The final principle establishes a "system of strongholds (regional priority sub-basins)" which would contain the most biologically significant populations and habitats.
	
These principles could be used to create the sub-basin strongholds and basin sanctuaries discussed above.  In regions where the habitat is currently highly fragmented due to high human populations, it may only be possible to create sub-basin level protections.  These areas include the regions at the southern end of the extent of salmon habitat such as northern California.  Full basin sanctuaries may only be possible in sparsely populated areas such as northern British Columbia and Alaska.  There likely would only be four to six of these basin scale sanctuaries.  These areas could be mixed use so as to provide value to local populations as well as salmon populations.  Mixed use would have limits though.  Such limits may include exclusions from areas of great value to salmon such as ideal spawning grounds or places where young fish may be vulnerable.  Strongholds would be determined by the value and practicality of connecting the often more intact headwaters with the often disturbed estuary zones.
	
This relatively new method of conservation does not advocate for the elimination of current conservation methods.  Instead, it builds a foundation for future salmon habitat that does not need such restoration and restriction.  These goals are large and will likely require funding that has never been seen in salmon conservation, but it has the potential to pay off better in the long term.  Until this kind of planning and funding is a reality, smaller scale projects like the one recently adopted in Puget Sound represent a bridge between old and new methods.

Puget Sound salmon recovery plan
In 2007, the National Marine Fisheries Service adopted a new plan for the recovery of salmon in Puget Sound.  It is estimated that currently 10% of the historic salmon runs still exist in the region.  Some individual runs have diminished to just one percent. The newly adopted plan combines specific efforts on the watershed level with more general legislation at the state level.  Focusing on watershed level management is similar to the ideas presented by Rahr et al., except that in the Puget Sound plan, all watersheds, no matter their value, have developed a plan of action.  However, by allowing each watershed group to customize their plan for conservation, higher value regions can adopt more of the principles set forth by Rahr et al.  Lower value watersheds will use more traditional methods to reach citizens and educate them about the ecology of their streams.
	
It may be that the Protective Sanctuary Strategy put forth by will be necessary to ensure the future of our wild salmon populations.  Unfortunately, large scale and high cost may prohibit it from becoming reality for some time.  In the meantime, efforts such as the Puget Sound Salmon Recovery Plan will slowly move toward that larger scale.  By combining the currently most practical basin sanctuary methods with proven legislation and community cooperation, salmon habitat in the Puget Sound will be well on its way to recovery and preservation.

Nigiri Project
Recently efforts in Northern California have been successful in increasing the size of very young salmon in a short period of time.  It is unclear what the long term results will be.  Rice fields near Davis California have been flooded in the wintertime to allow Salmon to eat on the remains of the fields.  Salmon have experienced substantial growth in just knee deep water.  The salmon appear to grow faster in these shallow fields instead of the deep rivers.

Simulating Rain upstream with Pulsing
Pulsing is being used as a method of attracting salmon upstream.  Cold dam water is released at certain times, which simulates rain from the mountains and attracts the salmon upstream.  Most recently this has been successful on the Mokelumne River which recently experienced its fifth largest salmon run in 74 years.

Hatcheries
There are debates over the effectiveness of hatcheries. Proponents of the plan argue that hatcheries are essential to the survival of salmon within the Puget Sound region and beyond. Other groups argue against the hatcheries because they claim that it offsets the environmental balance by introducing the artificially raised salmon populations and pitting them against the natural population.
The problem with hatcheries lies in the subtle connections between elements of the salmon system. The earliest hatcheries were simply egg-incubating that released small fry into the streams. Through this system, people tried to protect the eggs in the bottom of stream so that they would reduce the mortality of young salmon hoping to increase the salmon population. People raise them to fingerling size before turning them loose, and people put salmon in the tightly packed space. However, people feed them a mixture of fish offal, horse meat, tripe, and condemned pork and beef. As a result, it causes disease, furthermore, the disease infects from one salmon to others.

Habitat
Pacific salmon use a variety of freshwater and marine habitats and during migrations cross multiple international borders which makes effective conservation strategies difficult to organize and implement.  For example, native populations of these species are found in watersheds in Taiwan, China, Korea, Japan, Russia, Alaska, Yukon, British Columbia, Washington, Idaho, Oregon, and California, as well as in much of the North Pacific Ocean. Their habitat must be fixed and monitored before we can even begin to think about conserving and protecting these magnificent creatures. Salmon are a very resilient species, but human causes are driving them to the brink of disaster as we continue to invade their habitat space. Dams, population growth, and other human factors are significantly affecting the abundance and distribution of salmon runs around the Pacific Rim.

Dam removal
The life cycle of salmon is a very important factor in conservation. They return to the same gravel bed where they were hatched to lay their eggs and then die, providing the surrounding environment with nutrients that they would otherwise not have.  A recent study documented 137 species that benefit from and utilize the ocean-origin nutrients that salmon deliver. The creation of many dams along the Snake and Columbia Rivers have blocked Salmon access to some of the most pristine habitats available, preventing them for being able to spawn effectively as they would've done without the dams being in their way.  Even though some dams have fish ladders to assist salmon in their journey up the river, many salmon often die on their return to their birthplace.  If the dams were to be removed, and the region convert to utilizing alternative energy sources such as wind and wave power, this would allow for wild salmon to return to pristine habitats in which they could lay eggs that would more likely hatch and grow into substantial wild salmon and also provide nutrients to the already pristine habitat that will make it an even better salmon breeding area.  In 2000, the Oregon Chapter of the American Fisheries Society—representing hundreds of fishery professionals—passed a resolution that "The four lower Snake River dams are a significant threat to the continued existence of remaining Snake River salmon and steelhead stocks; and if society wishes to restore these salmonids to sustainable, fishable levels, a significant portion of the lower Snake River must be returned to a free-flowing condition by breaching the four lower Snake River dams, and this action must happen soon".  It is vital to salmon conservation that the remaining wild salmon be able to spawn in safe, quality habitats so that the populations of salmon can rise again.

Conservation versus Restoration

Conserving salmon broadly refers to saving, using with care, and taking precaution, whereas restoration refers to returning salmon runs back to a previous state. Restoration is more complicated than conservation and it has many meanings in river restoration at large.

Salmon Conservation Groups

There are many coalitions, councils, non-profits, and government-funded groups focused on conserving wild salmon. As Mindy Cameron wrote in a 2002 Seattle Times article, "billions of dollars have been spent to reverse declining salmon runs, with no guarantee of success. What's needed here is a new kind of public conversation about salmon and their place in our future."

See also
Nooksack Salmon Enhancement Association (NSEA)
 Steelhead and salmon distinct population segments
Wild Salmon Center

Notes

References
 Lackey, Robert T.; Denise H. Lach; and Sally L. Duncan.  Editors. 2006.  Salmon 2100:  The Future of Wild Pacific Salmon.  American Fisheries Society, Bethesda, Maryland.
 Frissell, Christopher A.;Peter H. Morrison; Susan B. Adams; Lindsey H. Swope; Nathaniel P. Hitt. 2000. Conservation Priorities: An Assessment of Freshwater Habitat for Puget Sound Salmon. The Wild Salmon Center.
 Rahr, Guido; Xanthippe Augerot. A Proactive Sanctuary Strategy to Anchor and Restore High-Priority Wild Salmon Ecosystems. The Wild Salmon Center. 2005
 Bland, Alastair, Nigiri Project shows that salmon and rice are a good match long before reaching sushi plate, http://plantingseedsblog.cdfa.ca.gov/wordpress/?p=5092 
 Hamilton, Ken, Mokelumne River Salmon Defy the Drought. http://thepinetree.net/index.php?module=announce&ANN_user_op=view&ANN_id=43883

Salmon
Conservation